The Reincarnation of Peter Proud is a 1975 American psychological horror film directed by J. Lee Thompson, and starring Michael Sarrazin, Margot Kidder, and Jennifer O'Neill. It follows a university professor who, after experiencing a series of bizarre nightmares, comes to believe he is the reincarnation of someone else. It is based on the 1973 novel of the same title by Max Ehrlich, who adapted the screenplay.

Plot
Peter Proud, a college professor in Los Angeles, begins having recurring dreams he cannot explain. In one particular nightmare, Peter witnesses the murder of a young man by his girlfriend, Marcia, while he swims naked in a lake near a hotel. As he screams his final words, "Marcia, don't!," she bludgeons him with an oar, and he drowns. In subsequent dreams, Peter witnesses brief vignettes from the man's life, including romances with two different women, and has visions of houses and landmarks that are unknown to him.

Peter is haunted by his dreams and seeks medical treatment. He attends a sleep laboratory to try to decipher his dreams. However, the resident doctor, Sam Goodman, informs him that his dreams do not register as being dreams; in fact, they do not register at all. One evening while watching television, several of Peter's visions play out before him on a local documentary film titled The Changing Face of America. He sees an arch and church in the documentary that have figured prominently in his dreams, and calls the television station to discover the location. Upon learning that the location of his "visions" is in Massachusetts, Proud and his girlfriend Nora travel there.

In Massachusetts, the couple drive from town to town, but are unsuccessful until they arrive in Springfield. It is here that Proud begins to see familiar sights from his visions, such as a bridge, a church, the Puritan statue, and others. Nora decides to return to California, tired of Peter's relentless searching, which she dismisses as delusion. After Nora leaves, Peter continues his journey. Eventually, Peter locates Marcia, the mystery woman from his nightmares, now a middle-aged alcoholic. Peter subsequently befriends Marcia's daughter Ann at a local country club where Marcia's husband Jeff was once a tennis pro; Ann has recently returned home to care for her emotionally unstable mother. Through his research, Peter uncovers that Jeff was found drowned in Crystal Lake in 1946 under mysterious circumstances.

Marcia is suspicious of Peter and curious about his motives, specifically how much he seems to know about her life. Ann and Peter quickly develop a romance, much to the disapproval of Marcia, who responds by increasingly drinking and taking prescription drugs. Peter initially has some hesitation toward pursuing a relationship with Ann after considering that she may have been his daughter in a previous life, but he ultimately chooses to continue the romance. Ann tells Peter her father proposed to Marcia in the same area where they just made love.

One afternoon, Marcia accompanies Peter and Ann to the country club, where they lounge at the poolside. While Ann goes for a swim, Marcia witnesses a sleeping Peter repeating the phrase "Marcia, don't!" in Jeff's voice. This horrifies her, and she flees home where she locks herself in her bedroom. Later, she masturbates to the memory of Jeff raping her after she confronted him about an affair he had while she was pregnant with Ann. The following day, Marcia confronts Peter, demanding to know his true identity. The two get into a heated argument, during which he confirms that he is a reincarnation of her deceased husband.

Meanwhile, Peter realizes that by having re-enacted or visited the sites of his visions, they seem to have ceased haunting him. The lake vision of Jeff's murder is his last to be conquered. Drawn to the lake where Jeff died years prior, Peter enters the water, hoping to unfetter himself from the vision. While in the water, Marcia approaches him in the same boat she did Jeff years ago, now brandishing a pistol. Addressing Peter as Jeff, Marcia asks why he has returned to torment her, and accuses him of incest with Ann. When Peter tries to climb into the boat, Marcia shoots him to death. She watches as his body sinks to the bottom of the lake.

Cast

Production
Film rights to the novel were sold to Bing Crosby Productions before the novel had been published. In April 1974 it was announced the film would star Michael Sarrazin, Margot Kidder and Jennifer O'Neill, and be directed by J. Lee Thompson. The novel came out in October - the Los Angeles Times called it "riveting".

Principal photography began on 24 April 1974 in Los Angeles and Massachusetts.

Release
The Reincarnation of Peter Proud premiered in New York City on April 25, 1975, and subsequently opened in Los Angeles on May 2.

Critical response 
The Reincarnation of Peter Proud received a mixed response from critics upon its release. Steven H. Scheuer labelled the film as a "clunky yarn". Mick Martin and Marsha Porter awarded the film their "turkey" rating and criticized it for its "turgid direction" and "contrived plot". Leslie Halliwell also panned the film as a "hysterical psychic melodrama which pretty well ruins its own chances by failing to explain its plot". The Philadelphia Inquirers Desmond Ryan dismissed the film as "an obtuse essay into the much trampled world of the occult, and it is aptly named since it seems to take several lifetimes to trudge through the film from its modest beginnings to its silly conclusion."

Some critics were more generous. Leonard Maltin wrote that the film was "moderately gripping". A.H. Weiler, like Halliwell, was unconvinced by the film's plot, but lauded it for its "polished [filmic] treatment" and Thompson's "properly moody [directorial] style".

In a retrospective review, Michael Barrett of PopMatters praised the film's cinematography and editing, which he notes provides "a sense of propulsion to what, in other hands, might be a stagnantly paced story; either sound or image are continually pulling at us, like fate...  There's something about The Reincarnation of Peter Proud that keeps it lodged in the memory like a nasty splinter."

Home media
In 2018, Kino Lorber released The Reincarnation of Peter Proud in a special edition Blu-ray featuring a new 4K restoration of the original film elements.

Proposed remake
On November 9, 2009, it was announced that Andrew Kevin Walker and David Fincher (the writer and director, respectively, of Seven) would work on the remake, with Paramount Pictures and Columbia Pictures financing the project. Filming and theatrical release of the remake were planned for 2016, but as of 2018, the project was listed as "in development".

New reports of a planned remake emerged in 2021, with development and production now handed over to David Goyer of Phantom Four Films in collaboration with Village Roadshow, and with Sean Durkin serving as writer and director.

See also
 List of American films of 1975
 Karz, 1980 Indian film which serves as a partial remake

References

External links

The Reincarnation of Peter Proud at TCMDB
The Reincarnation of Peter Proud at Letterbox DVD

1975 films
1975 drama films
1975 horror films
1970s psychological horror films
1970s supernatural horror films
American International Pictures films
American psychological horror films
American psychological thriller films
American supernatural horror films
American supernatural thriller films
Films set in Massachusetts
Films directed by J. Lee Thompson
Films about dreams
Films about reincarnation
Films based on American novels
Films scored by Jerry Goldsmith
Cinerama Releasing Corporation films
1970s English-language films
1970s American films